Pulmonic-contour clicks, also called sequential linguo-pulmonic consonants, are consonants that transition from a click to an ordinary pulmonic sound, or more precisely, have an audible delay between the front and rear release of the click. All click types (alveolar , dental , lateral , palatal , retroflex , and labial ) have linguo-pulmonic variants, which occur as both stops and affricates, and are attested in four phonations: tenuis, voiced, aspirated, and murmured (breathy voiced). At least a voiceless linguo-pulmonic affricate is attested from all Khoisan languages of southern Africa (the Khoe, Tuu, and Kx'a language families), as well as (reportedly) from the Bantu language Yeyi from the same area, but they are unattested elsewhere.

Analysis
Traditionally, contour clicks were believed to be uvular in their rear articulation, whereas non-contour clicks were thought to be velar. However, it is now known that all clicks are uvular, at least in the languages that have been investigated, and that the articulation of these clicks is more complex than that of others but no different in location. Miller (2011) analyzes them as contours (that is, as a transition from one kind of sound to another within a single consonant), whereas Nakagawa (2006) analyzes them as sequences of a click followed by a uvular consonant (that is, as consonant clusters). The benefit of a cluster analysis is that it greatly reduces the consonant inventory of the language. Taa, for example, has 164 known consonants, including 111 (and potentially 115) clicks, an extraordinary number considering that the largest inventory of any language without clicks, that of Ubykh, is 80 (84 consonants including loanwords). With a cluster analysis, the number of clicks in Taa is reduced to 43, and the total number of consonants to 87, only slightly surpassing Ubykh for the most consonants in the world. There are, however, some disadvantages to a cluster analysis: Although the click series and non-click series can often be made to align, in some languages there are consonants in these purported clusters that never occur alone, something that never happens with other kinds of consonants. Also, all other languages in the world that allow obstruent clusters (as English does with s and t in steep, and as these click clusters would be) also allow clusters with sonorants (as English does with r in treat). However, no Khoisan language allows a cluster of any consonant, click or otherwise, with sonorants like l, r, y or w. Miller concludes that the remarkably large numbers of consonants in these languages is real, a consequence of the greater number of permutations of clicks, where there are two places of articulation that can be independently manipulated.

Description
Phonetically, a linguo-pulmonic consonant is a click in which the forward and rear articulations are released independently. The forward articulation, made with the lips or the front of the tongue, releases with a lingual airstream as in any click. The rear articulation, however, is held longer, and when it is released, it is with a pulmonic airstream. (Linguo-ejective consonants are similar, except that the second release is ejective.) That is, such consonants have a double release burst, one ingressive (the air pulled in by the tongue) and the other egressive (the air pushed out by the lungs). The rear articulation is involved in both: it helps create the suction that powers the first, and then is itself released for the second. Because the back of the tongue operates in the uvular or pharyngeal part of the mouth to generate the first burst, and the two bursts are very close together in time, the second release is uvular as well.

Types
Six series of pulmonic-contour clicks (as classified by the rear release) are attested. There are two manners of articulation (stop and fricative) and four voicing contrasts, each of which is found for each of the places of articulation (as classified by the front release) that clicks use.

Linguo-pulmonic stops
In linguo-pulmonic stops, the rear articulation is released into a pulmonic stop. This may be tenuis, aspirated, voiced, or murmured (breathy-voiced). The modally voiced and breathy-voiced clicks tend to be prenasalized in the various languages which use them, for reasons which are not clear. They tend to be written with a  before or after the letter for the click, and with an  afterward for the aspirated and breathy-voiced clicks. The breathy-voiced consonants of some languages such as Juǀʼhoansi, including clicks, contain a voiceless interval and are sometimes written with mixed voicing. Miller (2003) attributes this to a larger glottal opening than is found in for example Hindustani breathy-voiced consonants.

Linguo-pulmonic affricates
The rear articulation may also be released as a fricative, one which may be either voiceless or voiced. Aspiration / breathy voice is not distinctive, as fricatives are not easily aspirated. However, because the forward articulation may be considered a stop, these are called affricates rather than fricatives. Both are used in the orthographies of Khoisan languages.

These clicks are affricates at the posterior place of articulation; they are independent of the fricated alveolar clicks, which are affricates at their anterior place of articulation, a manner which does not affect the airstream. The fricated alveolar clicks may be lingual or linguo-pulmonic—that is, they may be affricates at both places of articulation, or at one.

See also
Ejective-contour clicks
Glottalized clicks
Nasal clicks

Notes

References

 Amanda Miller, 2011. "The Representation of Clicks". In Oostendorp et al. eds., The Blackwell Companion to Phonology.

Click consonants